The Holy Spirit Cathedral is a cathedral in Minsk, Belarus. Consecrated in honour of the Holy Spirit, it the mother church of the Belarusian Orthodox Church. It was built between 1633 and 1642 as a part Bernardine monastery during the Polish–Lithuanian Commonwealth in a place of former male Orthodox monasteries. The site became Orthodox again in 1860.

History

Bernardine monastery 
Before 1596 on the site of the Holy Spirit Cathedral was an Orthodox male monastery consecrated in the name of saints Cosmas and Damian. The monastery also owned nearby lands on the eastern border of old Minsk and served as a military defense for the city. Its memory was preserved in the name of the nearby street of Cosmas and Damian, which bore this name until 1931 (during World War II all the buildings on the street were destroyed and the street disappeared).

In the early 17th century the monastery with all lands was given to the Ruthenian Uniate Church, but Uniates were unpopular among locals and the authorities decided to give the monastery to the Bernardine order. At that time all the buildings in Minsk were wooden, and the city suffered from constant fires. The Bernardines built the stone Holy Spirit Cathedral between 1633 and 1642; by 1652 they had constructed a stone convent. The complex was severely damaged during the Russo-Polish War of 1654–1667, then restored and reconsecrated in August 1687.

The church was damaged by fire in 1741, but the most destructive fire happened on May 30, 1835. Through the monastery it took over the entire city centre and destroyed many historical buildings and houses of common people. The Bernardines could not restore the church in its original form. By 1852 the order decided to close the monastery. The remaining nuns were transferred to Nesvizh and the monastery was abandoned until 1860.

On May 3, 2022, a monument to Metropolitan Filaret was unveiled near the Holy Spirit Cathedral in Minsk. Attending the ceremony was Belarusian President Alexander Lukashenko.

Christian church 
In 1860 the monastery was returned to the Orthodox Church. In 1869 the city treasury gave 13,000 roubles for the restoration. In a year the works were finished and the church was consecrated on October 22, 1870. They brought several valuable relics, including .

20th century 
In 1918 the church was closed and most of the churchware disappeared. The building was then used as a gym for local firefighters.

The church was opened during the Nazi occupation of Belarus in 1942. In the 1950s the building was restored. In 1961 the church became a cathedral of the Minsk diocese, and was then promoted to central cathedral of the Belarusian Orthodox Church. A new altar was installed in the south part of the church in 1968.

Relics 
The incorruptible relics of Sophia Olelkovich Radziwill, the granddaughter of Princess Anastasia Slutskaya, are displayed in the side niche on the left side of the altar.

Gallery

References

External links

Sources 

Minsk
Baroque church buildings in Belarus
Eastern Orthodox church buildings in Belarus
17th-century Eastern Orthodox church buildings
17th-century churches in Belarus